The 1986–87 UAB Blazers men's basketball team represented the University of Alabama at Birmingham as a member of the Sun Belt Conference during the 1986–87 NCAA Division I men's basketball season. This was head coach Gene Bartow's 9th season at UAB, and the Blazers played their home games at UAB Arena. They finished the season 21–11, 10–4 in Sun Belt play and won the Sun Belt tournament. They received an automatic bid to the NCAA tournament as No. 11 seed in the Southeast region. The Blazers fell in the opening round to eventual Final Four participant Providence, 90–68.

Roster

Schedule and results

|-
!colspan=9 style=| Regular season

|-
!colspan=9 style=| Sun Belt tournament

|-
!colspan=9 style=| NCAA tournament

References

UAB Blazers men's basketball seasons
UAB
UAB